The Honda CRF series is a line of four-stroke motocross, trail, and dual sport motorcycles manufactured and marketed by Honda.

The CRF line was launched in 2000 as a successor to the Honda CR series. They now have dual-sport motorcycles. The Honda CRF450R was the first in the series, followed by the CRF250R in 2004. Further down the line, the CRF450X and CRF250X bikes emerged, both designed for mostly off-road use. They are considered among the best motorcross bikes of their class, and have been a leading seller since their introduction.
The CRF450R was CycleWorld's Best Motocrosser for a record eight consecutive years from 2002-2009.

Engine technology 

The engines in these bikes use an over-square design, which means that the diameter of the cylinder is larger than the stroke of the piston. This allows for higher engine speeds and a reduction of reciprocating mass for a given displacement. Another technology that is used is short piston skirts. The "skirt" area of the piston is the portion on the side of the piston which comes into contact with the cylinder wall and aids piston stability. While the introduction of the shorter skirt on the piston helps to reduce reciprocating mass, it also leads to more "rocking" of the piston, or minute unwanted rotation of the piston around the axis of its wrist pin. This leads to more frequent maintenance intervals for the pistons, piston rings, and cylinder walls.

Model overview

CRF-F

As of 2021, the CRF-F series includes the CRF50F, CRF110F,  CRF125F, CRF125F (Big Wheel), CRF230F and CRF250F.

For the 2019 Model year the CRF 110F, CRF125F, and CRF250F all come standard with electronic fuel injection. This improves cold weather starting and makes the bike easier to maintain because of the lack of a carburetor to clean.

Simple, air-cooled 4-stroke motorcycles. Typically, these bikes come in low-power and confidence inspiring configurations for new market entrants.

In all, Honda has made a CRF50F, CRF70F, CRF80F, CRF100F, CRF110F, CRF125F, CRF125FB, CRF150F, CRF230F, and a CRF250F.

The CRF70F, CRF80F, CRF100F, CRF150F and the CRF230F have been discontinued. The 70 was replaced by the 110, the 80 and 100 were replaced by the 125, and the 150F does not have a replacement and the 230 was replaced by the 250F.

CRF-R 

As of 2017, the CRF-R series includes the CRF150R, CRF250R, and CRF450R.

These liquid-cooled four-stroke machines were designed to be utilized purely for closed-course motorcross racing. The CRF-R lineup lacks any extra accessories; like lights and electric start (Although offered as an option on the 2017 CRF-450R).

CRF-450R notable changes

CRF-RX 

As of 2018, the CRF-RX series includes the CRF250RX and CRF450RX.

This machine was built as a CRF-450R that was optimized for hare scramble, hard enduro, GNCC style racing. Essentially the same as the CRF-450R except offered as standard equipment an electric start, larger fuel tank, and an 18-inch rear wheel. This bike is to bridge the gap between the more mild X-model and the closed-course race style R model. (First model year: 2017)

CRF-X 

As of 2014, the CRF-X series includes the CRF250X and the CRF450X.

These bikes have electric start, but are still considered race bikes, albeit for off-road rather than motocross. Differences from the R models include lighting, electric start, suspension settings, engine and exhaust tuning for more low-end torque, larger fuel tanks, and a more rugged widespread ratio transmission. Robby Bell won the San Felipe 250 in 2006, 2007 and 2008.

CRF-L 

As of 2012, the CRF-L series includes the CRF150L, CRF190L, CRF250L/CRF300L, CRF450RL and the CRF1100L Africa Twin.

CRF230L 

In 2008, the  CRF230L was introduced as an entry-level dual sport and was street legal from the factory, but still retained a dirt-oriented design.  All have full lighting and electric starters.  They have a different frame and engine from Honda's other CRF formats, and most other components are not shared with the other CRF(non-street-legal) motorcycles.  These different components meet emissions and government road regulations.  Outside of the United States, the  CRF230L was marketed as the XR230L. It was discontinued in 2009.

CRF250L/CRF300L 

In April 2012, the completely redesigned dual-purpose CRF250L was launched in Japan. It shares a liquid-cooled 249 cc 4-stroke DOHC single-cylinder EFI engine with the CBR250R. It is manufactured in Thailand.

The stroked-up CRF300L was introduced in November 2020.

CRF150L 

In November 2017, the 150 cc model called CRF150L was launched in Indonesia. It shares an air-cooled 149 cc 4-stroke SOHC single-cylinder EFI engine with the Verza. It is manufactured by Astra Honda Motor.

CRF-M 

In 2008, the  CRF230L was the first to offer a supermoto version of the original dual sport, which had several mechanical and cosmetic differences including:
 Black body panels, frame, and wheels
 17 inch front and rear wheels
 Aluminum handlebar

In April 2013, exactly one year after the initial launch of the CRF250L, Honda announced plans to sell a supermoto version of their dual-purpose motorcycle in Europe. The CRF250M is based on the popular dual-purpose CRF250L, with revised suspension, uprated front brake and 17-inch wheels with wider road tyres. The CRF250M adds another A2 licence-friendly machine to Honda's line-up.

CRF Rally 

The CRF 250 Rally and 300 Rally are the more road oriented versions of the CRF 250L and 300L. The top differentiators are the larger fuel tanks, more fairing and different headlights. 300 Rally tank is 5 litre larger (12.8L vs 7.8L) and it has LED headlight integrated in a sizeable windshield, versus classic halogen bulb on 300L and no windshield.

See also 
 Honda Motorcycle Database
 Honda Dual-Purpose Models
 XR Series
 CR Series

References 

CRF
Off-road motorcycles
Motorcycles introduced in 2000